Sultan Musa Ghiatuddin Riayat Shah Ibni Al-Marhum Sultan Alauddin Sulaiman Shah (9 December 1893 – 8 November 1955) was Sultan of Selangor in Malaysia during the Japanese occupation of that state (1942–1945). He received the Order of the Rising Sun from the Emperor of Japan, Hirohito.

Early life

The eldest son of Sultan Alaeddin (1863–1938) by his royal consort Tengku Ampuan Maharum binti Raja Muda Tunku Dziauddin of Kedah was born in Istana Temasya Jugra, Kuala Langat. His name at birth was Tengku Musa Eddin.

Educated privately, he was made Tengku Mahkota in 1903. He succeeded his father's great-uncle Raja Laut bin Sultan Muhammad as Raja Muda or Crown Prince of Selangor in 1920. An intelligent young man, he represented his father on the State Council established by the British colonial authority.

However, at the instigation of the British Resident, Theodore Samuel Adams (1885–1961; in office 1935 - 1937), Tengku Musa Eddin was dismissed as Raja Muda in 1934 for alleged "misbehaviour". Adams had accused Tengku Musa Eddin as a spendthrift and wastrel with a penchant for gambling. However, many Malays in Selangor believed the real reason for Tengku Musa Eddin's dismissal was his refusal to follow Adam's orders.

Although Sultan Sulaiman pleaded for the case of Tengku Musa Eddin (even petitioning the Secretary of State for the Colonies and discussing the issue directly with him in London), Tengku Alam Shah was instead proclaimed Raja Muda or heir to the throne over the head of his other half-brother Tengku Badar. The appointment occurred on 20 July 1936.

Tengku Musa Eddin was given the title of Tengku Kelana Jaya Putera, ironically the title for the heir-apparent of the Yang di-Pertuan Muda (or Under-King) of Johor and Riau, from which the Sultans of Selangor are descended.

Tengku Alam Shah was proclaimed Sultan on 4 April 1938, four days after the death of his father. On 26 January 1939, he was crowned at Istana Mahkota Puri Negara in Klang. Tengku Musa Eddin presided over the ceremony with no ill feelings.

During the Japanese occupation of Malaya, on 15 January 1942, Col. Fujiyama, the Japanese Military Governor of Selangor, invited Sultan Hisamuddin Alam Shah to King's House in Kuala Lumpur. In an interview with Major-General Minaki the Sultan confessed that he had made speeches in support of the British war efforts but had been persuaded by the British resident to do so.

After being told to surrender the regalia to his older brother, the Japanese removed Sultan Hisamuddin and in November 1943, proclaimed Tengku Musa Eddin as the new Sultan of Selangor, taking the regnal name Sultan Musa Ghiatuddin Riayat Shah.

Sultan Hisamuddin Alam Shah declined to work with the Japanese and from 1943, refused their allowance awarded to him and his children.

After the war, Sultan Musa in turn was dethroned by the British Military Administration under Lord Louis Mountbatten upon the return of that colonial power to Malaya in 1945. Sultan Hisamuddin Alam Shah was reinstalled again as Sultan of Selangor.

Death

Sultan Musa was exiled to the Cocos Keeling Islands. Subsequently, he fell ill and was brought back to Selangor a few months before he died on 8 November 1955 in Kuala Lumpur. Sultan Musa was buried beside his father at the Royal Mausoleum in Klang.
His consort, Syarifah Mastura Shahabuddin of Kedah, became Tengku Permaisuri or Queen during his brief reign. She died in 1958. The couple had no children.

References

Dethroned monarchs
Musa Ghiatuddin Riayat Shah
Malayan collaborators with Imperial Japan
1893 births
Malaysian people of Malay descent
1955 deaths
Malaysian people of Bugis descent
Malayan people of World War II
Monarchs who abdicated
Recipients of the Order of the Rising Sun